The Primera División Sala is the top level women's futsal league in Spain, organized by the Royal Spanish Football Federation. The competition, which is played under UEFA rules, currently consists of 16 teams.

References 

Women's futsal in Spain
Futsal leagues in Spain
Women's futsal leagues